This is a list of trolleybus systems in France by region.  It includes all trolleybus systems, past and present. Bold text indicates a system that is still operating.

Alsace

Aquitaine

Burgundy

Brittany

Centre-Val de Loire



Upper Normandy

Île-de-France

Languedoc-Roussillon

Limousin

Lorraine

Midi-Pyrénées

Pays de la Loire

Picardy

Poitou-Charentes

Provence-Alpes-Côte d'Azur

Rhône-Alpes

Note: The TVR, or GLT, system in Caen and the Translohr system in Clermont-Ferrand are not listed, as they not commonly considered to be trolleybus systems, since their vehicles use pantographs to collect current and therefore are not able to operate away from the surface guideway while remaining in electric mode.  The GLT vehicles in Nancy, by comparison, are able to do so, as they use trolley poles to collect current, so the Nancy system is considered to be a trolleybus system.

See also

 List of trolleybus systems, for all other countries
 List of town tramway systems in France
 List of light-rail transit systems
 List of rapid transit systems
 Trolleybus usage by country

Notes

Sources

Books and periodicals
 Bruce, Ashley. Lombard-Gerin and Inventing the Trolleybus Trolleybooks, 2017, .
 Murray, Alan (2000). World Trolleybus Encyclopaedia. Reading, Berkshire, UK: Trolleybooks.  .
 Trolleybus Magazine, various issues. National Trolleybus Association (UK). Bimonthly. ISSN 0266-7452.

References

Further reading
 De Coster, Roland; Hamal, Thierry; and Stas, Dominique (eds.) (1997). TRAM 2000 - Flash 1997: France. Brussels, Belgium: TRAM 2000 asbl.

External links

France
 
Public transport in France
Trolleybus